Zhihong Chen is a Chinese-American nanoelectronics engineer known for her research on the electronic properties of carbon nanotubes and graphene. She is a professor of electrical and computer engineering at Purdue University.

Education and career
Chen graduated from Fudan University in 1998 with a bachelor's degree in physics. She went to the University of Florida for graduate study in physics, earning a master's degree in 2002 and completing her Ph.D. in 2003.

After postdoctoral research for IBM Research at the Thomas J. Watson Research Center, she became a permanent research staff member at the center in 2006. She moved to Purdue University as an associate professor in 2010, and was promoted to full professor in 2017.

Recognition
In 2022, Chen was named an IEEE Fellow "for contributions to the understanding and applications of low-dimensional nanomaterials".

References

External links
Home page

Year of birth missing (living people)
Living people
American electrical engineers
American nanotechnologists
American women engineers
Chinese electrical engineers
Chinese nanotechnologists
Chinese women engineers
Fudan University alumni
University of Florida alumni
Purdue University faculty
Fellow Members of the IEEE